Kaleb Lashun Eulls (born June 28, 1991) is an American football defensive tackle who is currently a free agent. He played college football at Mississippi State

Eulls attended Yazoo County High School in Mississippi, where he was rated a four-star recruit as a defensive end. He also played quarterback. While in high school, Eulls was lauded as a national hero for disarming a student who brought a gun onto a school bus.

Eulls played college football for Mississippi State, where he started all 52 games he played in 2011, 2012, 2013, and 2014, usually at defensive tackle. Eulls was named to the SEC-All Freshman team in 2011.

Professional career

New Orleans Saints
Eulls signed with the New Orleans Saints as an undrafted free agent in 2015. He played defensive tackle in 2015 and converted to offensive lineman in the 2016 offseason with the Saints. He was released by the Saints on August 29, 2016.

San Diego / Los Angeles Chargers
On September 4, 2016, Eulls was signed to the San Diego Chargers' practice squad. He was released on October 4, 2016. He was re-signed to the practice squad on November 21, 2016. He was promoted to the active roster on December 14, 2016.

On September 2, 2017, Eulls was waived/injured by the Chargers and placed on injured reserve.

Jacksonville Jaguars
On July 30, 2018, Eulls signed with the Jacksonville Jaguars. He was waived/injured on August 3, 2018 and was placed on injured reserve. He was released on November 13, 2018.

References

1991 births
Living people
American football defensive tackles
People from Yazoo County, Mississippi
Mississippi State Bulldogs football players
New Orleans Saints players
San Diego Chargers players
Los Angeles Chargers players
Jacksonville Jaguars players